Han Il-Koo (born 18 February 1987) is a South Korean football goalkeeper who plays for FC Seoul in the K-League.

Club career
Han was a supplementary selection from the K-League draft intake for FC Seoul for 2010, although he did not take to the field for the entire season.  An injury to first choice keeper Kim Yong-Dae in early May, saw Han promoted to the senior starting lineup. His first match for his club was in the group phase of the 2011 AFC Champions League against United Arab Emirates club Al-Ain FC, in which he kept a clean sheet and ensuring qualification for FC Seoul to the knockout stages of the competition.

Four days later, Han marked his debut in the 2011 K-League by conceding three goals in his side's 4 - 3 dramatic win over Sangju Sangmu Phoenix.  Kim Yong-Dae's return from injury in late May has seen Han relegated to the substitute bench.

Club career statistics

References

External links
 
 

1987 births
Association football goalkeepers
South Korean footballers
FC Seoul players
K League 1 players
Living people